Arve Grøvan Walde (born 19 May 1985 in Bergen, Norway) is a footballer playing for Fyllingsdalen. He is a younger brother of former club-colleague Knut Walde.

Career 
Walde debuted for Brann's first team in 2003, but apart from a short period in 2004, he never managed to establish himself in the starting line-up. In 2006, Walde was loaned out to the local club Løv-Ham, where he reunited with his brother Knut Walde. The clubs agreed on a one-year loan deal. Walde also signed a two-year contract with Brann before being loaned out to Løv-Ham. Before the 2007 season, however, he signed a contract making him Løv-Ham-player on a permanent basis. In 2012 Løv-Ham merged to form Fyllingsdalen, where Walde continued to play.

Honors

Norway 
Norwegian football cup: 2004

References

External links 
 

1985 births
Living people
Norwegian Christians
Norwegian footballers
SK Brann players
Eliteserien players
Løv-Ham Fotball players
Association football midfielders
Association football forwards
Footballers from Bergen